"Amor Genuino" is a song by Puerto Rican singer Ozuna, released as the second single from his third studio album Nibiru on June 4, 2019. It debuted at number 92 on the US Billboard Hot 100.

Composition
"Amor Genuino" is a piano ballad in which Ozuna asserts that while his judgement has often been "clouded", he has genuine love and intentions towards his lover.

Critical reception
HotNewHipHop described the song as a "soft ballad" that "will have everyone in their feelings". Vibe said the track "puts a lovely twist on urbano ballads".

Charts

Weekly charts

Year-end charts

References

2019 singles
2019 songs
Ozuna (singer) songs
Spanish-language songs
Songs written by Ozuna (singer)
Songs written by Edgar Semper
Songs written by Xavier Semper